Eastick is a surname. Notable people with the surname include:

Bill Eastick (1888–1914), Australian rules footballer
Brian Eastick (born 1951), English footballer and coach
Bruce Eastick (born 1927), Australian politician
Charles Eastick (1860–1947), British chemist
John Joseph Eastick (1855–1917), British chemist
Tom Eastick (1900–1988), Australian army officer

See also
Eastwick (disambiguation)